The 1936 Washington Huskies football team was an American football team that represented the University of Washington during the 1936 college football season. In its seventh season under head coach Jimmy Phelan, the team compiled a 7–2–1 record, finished in first place in the Pacific Coast Conference, was ranked No. 5 in the final AP Poll, lost to Pittsburgh in the 1937 Rose Bowl, and outscored all opponents by a combined total of 148 to 56. Chuck Bond was the team captain.

Schedule

NFL Draft selections
Six University of Washington Huskies were selected in the 1937 NFL Draft, which lasted ten rounds with 100 selections.

References

Washington
Washington Huskies football seasons
Pac-12 Conference football champion seasons
Washington Huskies football